Tractatus de mulieribus claris in bello (“Treatise on Women Distinguished in Wars”; Greek: , “Women wise and brave in the art of war”) is a short ancient Greek work by an anonymous author, which discusses fourteen famous ancient women, of whom one is not otherwise attested.  Despite the title, not all of the women discussed are warriors, and only a few are portrayed as skilled military strategists. It was written near the end of the second or the beginning of the first century BCE. 
Deborah Gera has suggested, however, that it was written by Pamphile of Epidaurus during the 1st century AD.
It is a list of individual ancient women, and contains the following individuals:
Semiramis
Zarinaea
Nitocris the Egyptian
Nitocris the Babylonian
Argeia
Dido
Atossa
Rhodogune of Parthia
Lyde(Woman who tames her son Alyattes by fasting)
Pheretime
Thargelia 
Tomyris 
Artemisia I of Caria
Onomaris

References

Text

Text of Tractatus de Mulieribus at archive.org

Ancient Greek literature
Anonymous works
Treatises